Verkhny Gulyum (Ürge Gölöm) is a rural locality (a village) in Yangurchinsky Selsoviet, Sterlibashevsky District, Bashkortostan, Russia. The population was 218 as of 2010. There are 4 streets.

Geography 
Verkhny Gulyum is located 25 km northwest of Sterlibashevo (the district's administrative centre) by road. Verkhotsenko is the nearest rural locality.

References 

Rural localities in Sterlibashevsky District